Southwest Harbor is a census-designated place (CDP) in the town of Southwest Harbor in Hancock County, Maine, United States. The CDP population was 720 at the 2010 census, out of 1,764 people in the town as a whole.

Geography
The Southwest Harbor CDP is the main village within the town of Southwest Harbor on Mount Desert Island. It is situated primarily around the tidal cove of Southwest Harbor and extends north to Norwood Cove. Both inlets are located at the southern end of Somes Sound, an arm of the Gulf of Maine.

Maine State Route 102 passes through Southwest Harbor, leading southwest  to Tremont and north  to Somesville at the north end of Somes Sound.

Demographics

References

Census-designated places in Maine
Census-designated places in Hancock County, Maine